The Confederation Line, also called O-Train Line 1, is a light rail line operated by OC Transpo in Ottawa, Ontario, Canada, as part of the city's O-Train light rail system. It opened on September 14, 2019, and is O-Train's second line. It operates on an east–west route, with a segment under Queen Street in the downtown core, complementing the north–south Trillium Line that operates to the west of the downtown core. Using light rail rolling stock and technology (e.g. pantograph electrical pickup from overhead catenary rather than a third rail), the Confederation Line is completely grade separated.

The project was approved by the Ottawa City Council and the contract was awarded in December 2012. Construction began in 2013.

History

The line was approved unanimously by the City Council on December 19, 2012, after many years of debate on a rapid transit network for the city. It represents the initial phase of the network and will be implemented through a 30-year Design-Build-Finance-Maintenance agreement with the Rideau Transit Group. It is operated by Alstom Citadis Spirit light rail vehicles.

The collapse forced evacuation of the Rideau Centre and the closing of a number of local streets and businesses; no one was injured or killed, but the nearly-completed tunnel was flooded, submerging a roadheader. Repairs were completed, and the city was cleared of any wrong-doing.

Testing of the line's rolling stock began in late 2016, and was planned to continue through most of the following year before the line was expected to achieve revenue service availability on May 24, 2018, followed by testing, acceptance, and opening of the line to the public. When the May 2018 deadline could not be achieved, it was announced the line would open to the public in November 2018. In September 2018, it was announced that the line would not open in November 2018 and would instead open in early 2019. In March 2019, this was pushed back to sometime between April and June 2019. In May 2019, the opening of the line was again delayed, until the third quarter of 2019, due to concerns about train operations. Rideau Transit Group failed to complete testing and hand over the system by the revised deadline of August 16, 2019, the fourth time RTG had not met a deadline it had revised with the city. OC Transpo announced on August 23, 2019, that the testing had been completed by RTG and the Confederation Line would open to the public on September 14, 2019.

On March 10, 2020, Ottawa City Council issued a notice of default to RTG, listing the flaws and problems with the line and its operation. Among the cited issues were a shortage of trains during rush hour, a maintenance facility fire, inadequate heating of train operator cars, and vehicle parts coming loose, the latter causing damage to transponders.

On November 30, 2022, a public inquiry led by Justice William Hourigan issued a report criticizing both city politicians as well as the Rideau Transit Group consortium for problems in building and implementing the Confederation Line. Hourigan found that project deadlines were unrealistic with unachievable dates, and that information about testing problems was disclosed neither to city council (other than to then-mayor Jim Watson) nor to the public. Hourigan also made 103 recommendations to fix problems, including a recommendation that the province investigate how to develop skills and capabilities to deliver large municipal projects.

Route and stations

Route
The Confederation Line runs from Tunney's Pasture station in the west to Blair station in the east, a distance of  including a  tunnel running under Queen Street in the central business district, including under the Rideau Canal. The line connects to the existing Transitway at both ends, and to the O-Train Trillium Line at Bayview station.

With complete grade separation, travel time from one end to another is less than 25 minutes. Train frequency is every 5 minutes or better during peak hours and every 15 minutes or better after 11PM (except Sunday). The hours of operation for the Confederation Line are:
 Monday to Thursday: 5am to 1am
 Friday: 5am to 2am
 Saturday: 6am to 2am
 Sunday: 8am to 11pm

There is no synchronization in the schedule for the last Confederation and Trillium line trains at Bayview station. (Trillium Line trains stop running just after midnight Monday through Saturday, and at 11:30pm on Sundays.) Thus, it is possible for a passenger to be stranded at Bayview if trains on one line arrive after the last train on the other has departed.

Stations

There are 13 stations in Stage 1 of the project.

All stations display an illuminated red "O" at the entrance. Every station has fare vending machines selling Presto cards, single-ride tickets, day passes, family passes and multi-day passes; vending machines accept cash, debit cards and credit cards. Stations have an information phone as well as emergency phones for those requiring assistance; vending machines also provide a video chat feature. Access through the fare gates to station platforms is via Presto card, U-Pass, STO Multi card, barcoded ticket or barcoded bus transfer. All 13 Stage 1 stations have elevators, and nine have escalators. Station stairways have a channel for passengers to push a bicycle. Four of the 13 stations have public washrooms.

The four major transfer stations—Blair, Bayview, and Tunney's Pasture—have a fare-paid area so that passengers transferring between bus and O-Train do not need to go through fare gates. ,  and  stations do not have nearby connecting buses.  is the major hub for STO (Société de transport de l'Outaouais) buses connecting with OC Transpo services.

Design issues
Station design concerns have been raised; shortcomings identified include steps that are slippery when wet, which have resulted in passenger injuries.

Future stations

Long-term expansion plans

Rolling stock
The winning consortium for the project, RTG, awarded Alstom a contract to provide 34 Citadis Spirit LRVs. It was the company's first order for modern light rail vehicles in North America, competing directly with similar models such as the Siemens S70 (which was originally ordered for the original extension plan for the Trillium Line but was later cancelled). Derived from the earlier Citadis Dualis tram-train used in Europe, they were manufactured in Alstom's plant in Hornell, New York, with final assembly taking place at Belfast Yard in Ottawa.

Signalling on the line is handled by Thales' SelTrac semi-automatic communication-based train control (CBTC) technology.

As part of a contest organized by OC Transpo, each train set (on both the Confederation Line and the Trillium Line) was given a name that relates to local or Canadian history.

An additional 38 Citadis Spirit vehicles were ordered by the city as part of the Stage 2 extension project with assembly beginning in early 2019. Originally all 38 vehicles were to be assembled in Ottawa like the original order; however, in July 2019 Alstom announced it would move the assembly of the last 25 vehicles from this order to their new plant in Brampton.  five of these vehicles had already been added to the operational revenue service fleet with several others in various stages of production and acceptance; most recent numbers also include 7 in line testing and 11 waiting for line testing. Each of the 38 additional vehicles will be added to the active Confederation Line fleet as they are completed.

Vehicle issues

The system encountered expected problems during testing with the train set during winter storms during early testing, including heating systems failing to work, communications systems failing, and body work on cars dropping off.

Following the transition to full LRT service, in early October 2019 the automated doors of the Spirit vehicles experienced numerous faults if pried open or held back by passengers. This resulted in service disruptions lasting up to 90 minutes due to a lack of proper procedures to isolate and disable the faulty doors while a train was in service. The vehicles also began encountering integration issues with Thales' SelTrac train control system that would lead to the on-board computer for some trains in service needing to be rebooted, causing delays of up to 20–30 minutes. Passengers also took issue with the overhead grab bars being too high to reach and that there were no straps to hold on to, with some resorting to scarves wrapped around bars or other means to stabilize themselves during travel. OC Transpo subsequently ordered and installed straps on all trains. Because the original design of the vehicles did not include straps, RTG quoted the cost of procuring and installing them to be $1million which OC Transpo rejected. OC Transpo said that by delaying the installation of the straps to after the line had launched, they only had to pay $200,000.

Although vehicle reliability improved later into 2019, a series of new reliability issues began starting on December 31, 2019, when two trains failed due to electrical failures caused by improperly cleaned electrical contacts and led to disruptions that lasted several hours. Throughout the start of 2020 the system's reliability issues continued with switch failures and continued unreliability of the vehicles. Insufficient heat generated by switch heaters would cause switches on the line to fail in heavy snowfall. Though the issue with the switch heaters had been flagged as a deficiency several times, the solutions implemented by RTG prior to the launch of the line were not effective at resolving the issue. Issues with the vehicles ranged from electrical failures occurring in inclement weather caused by manufacturing defects in the inductors that feed power into the vehicles, to brake faults, and flat spots becoming a common occurrence on vehicles causing many to need to be taken out of service. RTG struggled to keep up with the maintenance of the vehicles leading to several weeks where only a reduced number of trains could be operated during peak periods. On January 30, 2020, the Confederation Line reached an operational low when it was short five trains during rush hour due to "recurring mechanical and electrical issues". The Confederation Line was expected to field 15 working trains during rush hour, although it only operated 13 vehicles at once during peak periods due to the system requiring more spares than originally thought. The city expected to be able to operate with 15 trains at peak by the end of August 2020 as additional vehicles were completed for Stage 2 and added to the fleet, and on August 7, 2020, 15 trains were launched for peak service without issue.

Due to the unreliability of the system, the city has exercised its right to withhold the monthly maintenance payments it owes to RTG, which RTG disputes. An exception was the payment for September 2019, which the city was contractually obligated to pay regardless of the service provided.

Belfast Yard

An ultimate capacity of 66 LRVs (most recent numbers show 57 LRVs having been delivered to the yard, 34 Stage 1, 5 Stage 2 joining the revenue service fleet, 7 Stage 2 in line test, 11 Stage 2 waiting for line testing, and the remaining 15 Stage 2 yet to be delivered) will be stored at the Belfast Yard at 805 Belfast Road, with connecting track to the Confederation Line; a further capacity up to 90 LRVs would be stored at the Moodie Yard. Part of the  site was an existing OC Transpo facility. The yard site was created by combining this facility with the properties of a number of private business. All existing structures were demolished in 2013, and the new facilities were completed in 2016. The facility has a storage shed, maintenance facilities and an administration office. Final assembly for many of the LRVs was completed here.

Accidents and incidents 

 August 8, 2021 – An empty train derailed while switching tracks after leaving Tunney's Pasture after one of the ten axles derailed. There were no injuries. Technicians believe the derailment was caused by a loose connection of a wheel to its axle leading to excessive wear and eventual failure. An inspection of the fleet showed that nine other vehicles had the same problem.
 September 19, 2021 – A train with passengers derailed before entering Tremblay station after two axles became dislodged from the second car. There were no injuries. An improperly torqued bolt on the train's gearbox was identified as the cause of the derailment. Service was partially resumed on November 12, 2021, with full service expected to resume by the end of November.
 July 24, 2022 – At approximately 11:15 pm, lightning struck the overhead catenary system, downing  of cable near Lees station. Train service between Rideau and St. Laurent stations was interrupted for four and a half days.

Construction

In mid-April 2015, OC Transpo posted a list of bus route changes as a result of the closure of the Transitway between Hurdman station and Blair station. As a result of the closure, many new routes are being created, such as route 91, and existing routes modified, most notably routes 61, 62, 94 and 95. Many routes will use new bus-only lanes on Highway 417, and several others will be altered or shortened to avoid serving the construction area. The changes are meant to provide extra service to those in areas affected by the Transitway closure, and to avoid as many delays as possible while construction on the Confederation Line progresses. A side project on the 417 highway was completed in 2016.

Stage 2

In November 2013, the City of Ottawa released its new transportation master plan, which included plans to build  of new rapid transit and 19 new stations. This also included plans to extend the Confederation Line westward to Bayshore station and to Baseline station, and eastward to Place d'Orleans station. In July 2015, the city released a functional report on the Stage 2 system expansion, which added plans to extend the Confederation Line eastward from Place d'Orleans station to Trim station. An extension westward to Moodie Drive from Bayshore station was announced in February 2017. This totals an extension of 11 stations,  westward and 5 stations,  eastward. Stage 2 will add a new light maintenance and storage facility along Corkstown Road, west of Moodie station.

Construction began in the second quarter of 2019, as the initial line became operational. The full system would be operational by 2026, with the east extension to Trim operational by 2025. Construction is currently ongoing, for implementation of the city's plan to address the current gap in service between Dominion station and Lincoln Fields station where buses travel on the Sir John A. Macdonald Parkway a little over  without stopping. The plan calls for burying trains for most of the route, creating a shorter, straighter alignment. The new route will also include two new LRT stations in an urban area with intensification opportunities.

See also

 Transitway (Ottawa)
 Urban rail transit in Canada

References

Inline citations

Bibliography

 
 Schepers, Nancy (June 22, 2015). Report to Finance and Economic Development Committee June 29, 2015, and Council July 8, 2015. Submitted on June 22, 2015, by Nancy Schepers, Executive Advisor, Light Rail Planning and Implementation. File Number: ACS2015-CMR-OCM-0017. Subject: Stage 2 Light Rail Transit (LRT) Environmental Assessment and Functional Design Report. Retrieved July 6, 2015.
 OC Transpo's Announcement video of their chosen Light Rail Vehicle

External links
OC Transpo O-Train Line 1
OC Transpo Ready for Rail
Confederation Line – official website for construction of Stage 1 (archived now that Stage 1 is completed)
Stage 2 Light Rail Transit Project

O-Train
Public–private partnership projects in Canada
Railway lines opened in 2019
Light rail in Canada
2019 establishments in Ontario
Rapid transit lines in Canada